Mahāfatā Khān Bahādur, was a Faujdar of the Mughal Bengal's Sylhet Sarkar. He governed Sylhet under the Subahdar of Bengal, Shaista Khan and Mughal emperor Aurangzeb. He was the successor of the previous faujdar, Jan Muhammad Khan. In 1670, Mahafata granted Raghunath Bisharad, of Ita Pargana, 3.5 hals of land. This was the same person who had also been gifted land from a previous faujdar of Sylhet by the name of Lutfullah Khan Shirazi. In the same year, Mahafata was succeeded by Faujdar Farhad Khan.

See also
History of Sylhet
Isfandiyar Beg

References

Rulers of Sylhet
17th-century rulers in Asia
17th-century Indian Muslims